Physiological and Biochemical Zoology is a peer-reviewed scientific journal published by the University of Chicago Press on behalf of the Society for Integrative and Comparative Biology. Traditionally, it has covered research on the biochemistry, physiology, and genetics of animals. A recent editorial change has expanded the scope to include life-history traits, comparative biomechanics, and behavioral endocrinology, as well as a wider range of paper categories, including those related to educational outreach. The journal has also published a number of Focused Collections based on calls for papers or conference symposia. The current editor-in-chief is Theodore Garland, Jr. (University of California, Riverside). Previous Editors include Charles Manning Child, Warder Clyde Allee, and Clifford Ladd Prosser.  The journal was established in 1928 as Physiological Zoology, obtaining its current name in 1999. According to the Journal Citation Reports, the journal has a 2019 impact factor of 2.250.

References

External links 
 

University of Chicago Press academic journals
Zoology journals
Bimonthly journals
English-language journals
Publications established in 1928